NS5 may refer to:

Non-structural protein 5
 NS5 protein, a 900-residue peptide found in the Dengue virus
 NS5A (Hepacivirus), a zinc-binding and proline-rich hydrophilic phosphoprotein
 NS5B (Hepacivirus), a viral protein found in the hepatitis C virus

Places
 Cape Breton Centre (constituency N.S. 05), Nova Scotia, Canada
 Yew Tee MRT station (station code: NS5), an above-ground Mass Rapid Transit station on the North South line in Choa Chu Kang, Singapore
 Tsuzumigataki Station (station code: NS5), Kawanishi, Hyōgo Prefecture, Japan
 Komba Station (station code: NS05), Kita-ku, Saitama, Japan

Other
 NS-5, a model of robot in the 2004 American science fiction action film I, Robot
 NS5-brane, a five-dimensional p-brane that carries a magnetic charge under the B-field
 Blue Origin NS-5, a 2016 June 19 Blue Origin suborbital spaceflight mission for the New Shepard
 RAF N.S. 5, a British NS class airship
 Netscape Communicator 5, a cancelled webbrowser and internet suite
 Mozilla Application Suite webbrowser initial release, identified as Netscape 5

See also

 NS4 (disambiguation)
 NS (disambiguation)
 5 (disambiguation)